Jolana may refer to:

 Jolana (name)
 Jolana (guitar brand)